Drăgușeni is a commune located in Suceava County, Romania. It is composed of three villages: Broșteni, Drăgușeni and Gara Leu.

Natives
 Gheorghe Cardaș

References

Communes in Suceava County
Localities in Western Moldavia